Charles Dale Gray (born January 20, 1958) is an American author and politician who served as a member of the Arizona House of Representatives and a member of the Arizona Senate from 2003-2006 and 2007-2011, respectively. During his tenure in the Arizona Senate, Chuck served as the majority leader of the Republican caucus. Before entering politics, he was a police officer for the city of Mesa, Arizona. Chuck is the author of Living the American Dream, a book published in 2013. He is the father of five children and currently resides in Queen Creek, Arizona.

Early life 
Chuck Gray was born and raised in Mesa, Arizona. At the age of 19, Chuck served a mission for the Church of Jesus Christ of Latter-day Saints in Spain where he learned to speak fluent Spanish. After serving as a missionary, Chuck attended Mesa Community College, where he met his future wife, Connie Jones. They were married and are now parents of five children and multiple grandchildren.

Career

Law enforcement career 
In 1990, Chuck fulfilled his lifelong dream of becoming a police officer upon joining the Mesa Police department, where he served for 10 years. As a police officer, Chuck worked as a patrol officer, a field training officer, a detective, as well as a translator for the department due to his knowledge of Spanish. After leaving Mesa Police Department, Chuck took on a full-time position with an internet company that he had founded in 1997—selling automotive accessories around the world.

Political career 
In 2002, Chuck decided to run for the Arizona House of Representatives. He received the second-most votes, behind Gary Pierce, and advanced to the general election, where he and Gary Pierce were elected to represent Arizona's 19th district in the House of Representatives. He was re-elected in 2004.

In 2006, Chuck ran for and was elected to serve in the Arizona Senate. He was re-elected in 2008. During his time in the Arizona State Senate, he served as the majority leader of the Republican caucus.

In January 2020, Chuck announced his bid for Pinal County Supervisor, touting his experience in the Arizona Legislature and vision for SanTan Valley.

Electoral history 

 
 
 
 
 
 

 
 
 
 
 
 
Note: For each of the elections described above, no Democratic candidates filed to run. Further, Arizona House districts are multi-member districts, meaning that the top 2 vote receivers for each party advance to the general election and the top 2 vote receivers win the election.

References

External links

Republican Party members of the Arizona House of Representatives
1958 births
Living people